Poroštica may refer to:
 Poroštica (Lebane), a village in the municipality of Lebane, Serbia
 Poroštica (Medveđa), a village in the municipality of Medveđa, Serbia